Tabaré may refer to:
 Tabaré (poem), an 1888 epic poem by Juan Zorrilla de San Martín
 Tabaré (given name), including a list of people with the name
 Tabare Rural LLG, Papua New Guinea
 Tabaré (opera by Alfonso Broqua), an opera in Latin America
 Tabaré (opera by Arturo Cosgaya Ceballos), an opera in Latin America
 Tabaré (opera by Heliodoro Oseguera), an opera in Latin America
 Tabaré (opera by Tomás Bretón), an opera by Tomás Bretón